Nutrition bar may refer to:

Cereal bar (disambiguation)
Energy bar
Protein bar